The Oregon Symphony, based in Portland, Oregon, was founded in 1896 as the Portland Symphony Society; it is the sixth oldest orchestra in the United States (and the oldest in the Western United States), and claims to be one of the largest arts organizations in the Pacific Northwest. The Symphony has released nineteen studio albums and one compilation album through the record labels Delos, Koch International Classics, Albany and PentaTone Classics. The first recording, Bravura (1987), was released under the artistic leadership of James DePreist. It received favorable reviews and was the first of three released through Delos. The next two recordings were collections of compositions by Sergei Rachmaninoff (The Sea and the Gulls, 1987) and Pyotr Ilyich Tchaikovsky (Tchaikovsky: 1812 Overture; The Tempest; Hamlet, 1989).

In 1992, the orchestra released its first record through Koch, with works by Gian Carlo Menotti, Ronald Lo Presti and Norman Dello Joio. DePreist and the Symphony then issued two special edition albums not available commercially: Romeo and Juliet (1992), featuring Tchaikovsky's Fantasy Overture Romeo and Juliet, and Roman Festivals (1993), a re-issue of the performance of Respighi's Feste Romane from Bravura. On Martin Luther King, Jr. Day in 1995, the Symphony released its second album through Koch, with works by Joseph Schwantner and Nicolas Flagello; more than 30 United States radio stations broadcast Schwantner's piece on the holiday to commemorate the civil rights leader. The album reached a peak position of number three on Billboard Classical Albums chart and remains the Symphony's best-selling album to date. Later that year, to commemorate its centenary, the Symphony released its first compilation album, Centennial Collection, which contained material from previously released recordings. Erich Wolfgang Korngold: The Sea Hawk; Symphony in F-Sharp followed in 1998.

During DePreist's final five years as music director, the Symphony was able to fund two recording sessions per year due to a $1 million bequest that established the Gretchen Brooks Recording Fund. The first two resulting albums were Stravinsky: The Rite of Spring; The Firebird Suite (2001) and Respighi's Rome (2001), which completed the "Roman Triptych" of Respighi started by Bravura and continued with Roman Festivals. The remaining albums released through Delos included American Contrasts (2003), Shostakovich: Symphony No. 11 "The Year 1905" (2003), Sibelius: Symphony No. 2; Symphony No. 7 (2004), Walton: Suite from Henry V; Cello Concerto; Violin and Piano Sonata; Bernard Rands: Tre Canzoni Senza Parole (2005) and Tragic Lovers (2008). Each of these featured DePreist as conductor, though some were released following his departure from the Oregon Symphony in April 2003. In 2003, the orchestra also released Orchestral Works by Tomas Svoboda, its first album through Albany. The recording of Tomáš Svoboda's Concerto for Marimba and Orchestra, featuring percussionist Niel DePonte, received a Grammy Award nomination for Best Instrumental Soloist Performance with Orchestra. The orchestra released 17 albums conducted by DePreist.

In 2011, the Symphony released Music for a Time of War, which debuted and peaked at number 31 on Billboard Classical Albums chart and received Grammy Award nominations for Best Orchestral Performance and Best Engineered Album, Classical. This England and Spirit of the American Range followed in 2012 and 2015, respectively. These recordings marked the first three of four albums to be produced by the Symphony and the Dutch record label PentaTone by the end of the 2014–15 season, all under the artistic leadership of current conductor Carlos Kalmar.

Studio albums

Compilation albums

References

General
 
 

Specific

Discographies of American artists
Orchestra discographies
Discography
Portland, Oregon-related lists